Esthela Acero Lanchimba (born December 22, 1984) is an Ecuadorian politician.

Life 

Acero was born in Cangahua in Cayambe Canton in 1984.

The new members will serve for the next six years. Acero was proposed by Alianza País. The others were proposed by other leading parties. Enrique Pita, for Creo ; Diana Atamaint is proposed by the Confederation of Indigenous Peoples and Nationalities ( Conaie ), José Cabrera, for the Social Christian Party ( PSC ) and the Guayaquil Civic Board's candidate was Luis Verdesoto. 

On 20 November 2018 Diana Atamaint became president of the National Electoral Council after an internal election. There were five members of the council and two of them, Enrique Pita and José Cabrera, supported her election while the other two, Luis Verdezoto and Acero did not.

In July 2022 she was being impeached as it was alleged that the National Electoral Council had failed to investigate irregularities in the 2021 general election. Charges were made against her and Diana Atamaint, Enrique Pita, José Cabrera and Luis Verdesoto (even though he was no longer a councillor). Joel Abad and Mario Ruiz Jácome alleged that the council had not investigated inconsistancies in 39,000 ballot boxes. There were doubts as to whether the National Assembly's Oversight Commission were allowed to impeach the council. On 12 July a proposal to halt the impeachment process made by Ana Belén Cordero was accepted by the commission.

References 

1984 births
Living people
People from Cayambe Canton
PAIS Alliance politicians
Members of the National Assembly (Ecuador)